Manzanillo, Panama may refer to

Manzanillo Bay, a bay on the Atlantic coast of Panama, near the eastern entrance to the Panama Canal
Manzanillo Island, a small island in that bay which made up Colón before its expansion following the demise of the Canal Zone
Manzanillo International Terminal, a port terminal on that bay

See also:
Manzanillo (disambiguation)